The Cardigan Bay Visitor was a weekly English language newspaper distributed around Cardigan Bay, Towyn, Barmouth, and Dolgellau. It contained local news and information and a list of visitors. It was published by J. Gibson.

Welsh Newspapers Online has digitised 558 issues of the Cardigan Bay Visitor (1887-1905) from the newspaper holdings of the National Library of Wales.

References

Newspapers published in Wales